Murrumba is an electoral district of the Legislative Assembly in the Australian state of Queensland.

The district is based in the outer northern suburbs of Brisbane. It includes the suburbs of Deception Bay, Kippa-Ring, Murrumba Downs and Rothwell. The electorate was first contested in 1912.

Members for Murrumba

Election results

References

External links
 

Electoral districts of Queensland
1912 establishments in Australia